Aeroflot Flight 012 was a scheduled international passenger flight from Beijing, China to Moscow, Soviet Union on Saturday, July 13, 1963, which crashed on landing at a scheduled stopover in Irkutsk. 33 of the 35 people on board died in the crash.

Aircraft
The aircraft involved was a Tupolev Tu-104B, registration СССР-42492.

Synopsis
The plane took off from Beijing around 2:49am Moscow time en route to Irkutsk at 9,000 meters. With low cloud cover over the Irkutsk airport, the crew received contradictory weather data about the low height of the cloud tops. The plane ended up descending too early. Upon exiting the cloud cover less than 60 meters from the ground, the pilots attempted to take evasive action but could not and the plane impacted terrain two miles short of the runway around 10am local time.

Casualties
33 of the 35 people on board died in the crash, including all eight crew members and 25 passengers. Two passengers survived. Among the dead were seven Albanians including the Albanian ambassador to China and poet Drago Siliqi, as well as three Chinese. The remains of the Albanian and Chinese victims were taken to Beijing for a major public burial attended by Premier Zhou Enlai. In contrast, a United States aviation periodical noted the Soviet press "virtually ignored" the crash.

References 

Aviation accidents and incidents in 1963
Aviation accidents and incidents in Russia
Aviation accidents and incidents in the Soviet Union
1963 in Russia
12
Accidents and incidents involving the Tupolev Tu-104
July 1963 events in Europe
1963 in China
Irkutsk